Alone in the Jungle is a 1922 German silent film directed by Ernst Wendt. It was re-released in a shorted version under the title of Die Rache der Afrikanerin (Revenge of the African Woman). A copy of the second, shorter version still exists in the German Federal Archives.

The film's sets were designed by Gustav A. Knauer, Friedrich E. Stier and Johann Umlauf.

Cast
 Karl Balta as Fridolin Rist
 Carl de Vogt as Ingenieur Gyldendal
 Lulu Hassan as Manga
 Madge Jackson as Ngumba
 Cläre Lotto as Maria Almquist
 Lothar Mehnert as van Scheven, Gyldendals Freund
 Loni Nest
 Nora Swinburne as Lydia Gyldendal

References

Bibliography

External links
 

1922 films
German silent feature films
1920s German-language films
Films directed by Ernst Wendt
Films of the Weimar Republic
German black-and-white films
1920s German films